The 1985–86 season was the sixth time Tennis Borussia Berlin played in the 2. Fußball-Bundesliga, the second highest tier of the German football league system. After 38 league games, Tennis Borussia finished 19th and were relegated. The club also lost in the first round of the DFB-Pokal; going out 1–0 away to Alemannia Aachen. Peter Fraßmann scored 8 of the club's 48 league goals.

1985–86 Tennis Borussia Berlin squad

1985–86 fixtures

Player statistics

Final league position – 19th

References

External links 
 1985–86 Tennis Borussia Berlin season – squad and statistics at fussballdaten.de 

Tennis Borussia Berlin seasons
German football clubs 1985–86 season